Aline Amaru (born 1941) is a textile artist from Tahiti, French Polynesia. She specializes in creating a traditional Tahitian appliqué quilt known as tifaifai. Her work is in the permanent collection of the Queensland Art Gallery.

References

Women textile artists
1941 births 
Living people